Shizuma may refer to:

 Shizuma Station, a train station 
 Shizuma Hodoshima, a Japanese voice actor
 Shizuma Hanazono, one of the main characters in Strawberry Panic
 Eiku Shizuma, a character in Blade of the Immortal
 Hasekura Shizuma, a character in Nursery Rhyme
 Shizuma Kusunagi, a character in Samurai Girl: Real Bout High School
 Shizuma, the protagonist of Brave Saga 2